Borgo Veneto is a comune (municipality) in the Province of Padua in the Italian region Veneto.

It was established on 17 February 2018 by the merger of former municipalities of Megliadino San Fidenzio, Saletto and Santa Margherita d'Adige.

References

Cities and towns in Veneto